Elugelab, or Elugelap, was an island, part of the Enewetak Atoll in the Marshall Islands.  It was destroyed by the world's first true hydrogen bomb test on 1 November 1952, a test which was codenamed shot "Mike" of Operation Ivy. Prior to being destroyed, the island was described as "just another small naked island of the atoll".

This maximum is reached a number of seconds after the detonation and during this time the hot fireball invariably rises due to buoyancy.

The island "became dust and ash, pulled upward to form a mushroom cloud that rose about twenty-seven miles into the sky." The outcome of the test was reported to incoming president Eisenhower by Atomic Energy Commission Chairman, Gordon Dean, as follows: “The island of Elugelab is missing!”.

According to Eric Schlosser, all that remained of Elugelab was a circular crater filled with seawater, more than a mile in diameter and "fifteen stories deep". The blast yielded 10.4 megatons of explosive energy, 700 times the energy that leveled central Hiroshima.

Aerial footage of Elugelab and adjacent islands well before Mike shot at a time prior to the connecting causeway being created is available, as is footage after the causeway was finished that supported the diagnostic Krause-Ogle box light pipe system, with numerous trees removed in preparation of the shot also plainly evident, along with footage of the aforementioned helicopter survey of the Mike crater soon after the detonation, and finally, high-altitude footage of the crater accompanied with details of its depth"175 feet deep"equivalent to the height of a "17-storey building" and with an area large enough to accommodate about "14 Pentagon buildings".

The detonation also collapsed some natural crevices in the reef, some distance away from the rim of the crater.

Full radioecology recovery surveys were documented before and after each test series.

Gallery

See also
 Nuclear fusion
 Ivy Mike
 Operation Ivy
 Operation Castle
 Operation Redwing
 Nuclear fission
 Meteor Crater, or Barringer crater – a deeper crater that formed in a natural impact event with the release of about the same amount of energy: 10 megatons.
 Krakatoa – a larger island that was destroyed by a much more powerful natural volcanic explosion.
Explosion crater

References

External links
 "Mike" Test from PBS

Former islands
Nuclear weapons
Enewetak Atoll
Explosion craters
Articles containing video clips
Islands of the Marshall Islands